Zien is a surname.  Notable people with the surname include:

 Chip Zien (born 1947), American actor
 David Zien (born 1950), American politician
 Maciej Zien (born 1979), Polish fashion designer
 Sam Zien, Canadian-born cook, YouTube personality, author, and restaurateur

See also
 Zinn